The 1892 Louisiana gubernatorial election was held on April 19, 1892. Like most Southern states between Reconstruction and the civil rights era, Louisiana's Republican Party was virtually nonexistent in terms of electoral support. In addition, the Republican Party had split into two factions, each supporting a different candidate. As Louisiana had not yet adopted party primaries, this meant that the Democratic Party convention nomination vote was supposed to be the real contest over who would be governor. At the convention, pro-lottery former Governor Samuel D. McEnery was nominated. As a result of the nomination of a pro-lottery candidate, a group of anti-lottery Democrats nominated their own candidate, State Senator Murphy J. Foster. In addition to the four candidates already mentioned, the increasingly popular Populists nominated R. H. Tannehill and their candidate. Despite all of this, Senator Foster was elected with 45% of the vote with a comfortable 19% margin between him and McEnery, who placed second. This election marked the last time until 1979 that the official Democratic Party nominee was defeated.

Results  

General Election, April 17

References

1892
Louisiana
Gubernatorial
April 1892 events